Ahinadab (Hebrew: אחינדב Ahinadav, "my brother is noble" or "my brother has devoted himself"), son of Iddo, is one of the twelve commissariat officers appointed by Solomon to districts of his kingdom to raise supplies by monthly rotation for his household. He was appointed to the district of Mahanaim, east of Jordan.

See also
 List of biblical names starting with A
 List of minor Old Testament figures, A–K

References

 

Books of Kings people
10th-century BCE Hebrew people